The 2007 All-Ireland Minor Camogie Championship is a competition for age graded development squad county teams in the women only team field sport of camogie was won by Kilkenny, who defeated Cork by 14 points in the final, played at Clonmel.

Arrangements
Antrim, winners of the minor B championship, defeated Clare in the quarter-finals. Cork's defensive heroes against Tipperary in the semi-final at the Gaelic Grounds were Maria Walsh, Leah Weste and Áine Moynihan. Cork were foiled by the excellent goalkeeping of Kristine Kenneally but progressed by 1–10 to 1–5

B Division
The Minor B final was won by Antrim who defeated Down by nine points in the final at Páirc Esler (Newry), reversing the previous year's result. In the semi-finals Down defeated Roscommon (10–25 to 0–3) and Antrim defeated Waterford (5–27 to 0–2).

The Final
Kilkenny's Marie Dargan and Michelle Quilty scored 3–7 between them in the final.

Final stages

References

External links
 Camogie Association

Minor
All-Ireland Minor Camogie Championship